Marco Pewal (born September 17, 1978 in Villach) is an Austrian former professional ice hockey forward who last played with EC VSV of the Austrian Hockey League (EBEL). He participated at the 2011 IIHF World Championship as a member of the Austria men's national ice hockey team. He is currently an assistant coach in EC VSV junior youth program.

References

External links

1978 births
Austrian ice hockey forwards
EC Red Bull Salzburg players
Living people
Sportspeople from Villach
EC VSV players
EK Zell am See players